Patrice Martinez (June 12, 1963 – December 24, 2018), was an American actress. She received her theatrical education in London, played the role of Carmen in the film Three Amigos, and starred in the early 1990s television series Zorro.

Life and career
Martinez was born in Albuquerque, New Mexico. As a child, she performed in a local theater. She started her screen career as a teenager, working as an extra in the film Convoy, directed by Sam Peckinpah. After high school, when she was eighteen, she moved from Albuquerque to study at the Royal Academy of Dramatic Art (RADA) in London.

She returned to the United States, and soon moved to Los Angeles, California, where she gained her first film experience in A Walk on the Moon. She appeared in Three Amigos in 1986, and later accepted a role on Magnum, P.I. with Tom Selleck, portraying Linda Lee Ellison in season 7 ("Forty") and season 8 (the series conclusion, "Resolutions", episodes 12 & 13). After that, she portrayed Victoria Escalante in Zorro and appeared in Beetlejuice, The Effects of Magic, and Vital Signs.

Martinez is the sister of Benito Martinez and the daughter of Margarita Martinez-Cannon. She also has a sister, Benita, who looks like her but is two years younger. Benita was also cast in Three Amigos.

From 1987 until 1992, Martinez was married to producer-director Daniel Camhi, and was credited as "Patrice Camhi" in the first two seasons of Zorro. Martinez and Camhi divorced, so she appeared as Patrice Martinez from Season Three on.

Death 
Martinez died on December 24, 2018, at her home in Burbank, California, after a long illness.

Filmography

Awards 
 The Sir Emile Littler Award (at RADA) for "Outstanding Talent"
 The Flora Robson Award (at RADA) for the "Best Talent from Overseas"
 The Edmund Gray Memorial Award (at RADA) for "Best Performance in a Restoration Company"
 The Dame Edith Evans Memorial Award (at RADA) for "Excellence in Speaking Poetry"
 The Lord Lurgan's Ivar Novello Award (at RADA) for her "Grace and Charm in Movement"
 The Margo Albert Golden Eagle Award (1987) for "Most Promising Actress"
 The SAG/AFTRA Award for "Achievements in the Entertainment Industry"

References

External links 

1963 births
2018 deaths
Actresses from Albuquerque, New Mexico
Alumni of King's College London
American children's writers
American film actresses
American television actresses
Alumni of RADA
20th-century American actresses